Francis M. Naumann (born April 25, 1948) is a scholar, curator, and art dealer, specializing in the art of the Dada movement and the Surrealist periods.  He has an MFA degree in painting from the Art Institute of Chicago (1973) and a PhD in art history from the Graduate Center of the City University of New York (1988).

He taught art history at Parsons School of Design from 1977 through 1990, and is author of numerous articles and exhibition catalogues, including New York Dada 1915-25 (Harry N. Abrams, 1994) and Marcel Duchamp: The Art of Making Art in the Age of Mechanical Reproduction (Harry N. Abrams, Inc. 1999).

In 1996, he organized "Making Mischief: Dada Invades New York" for the Whitney Museum of American Art, in 1997, "Beatrice Wood: A Centennial Tribute" for the American Craft Museum in New York, and, in 2003, he co-curated "Conversion to Modernism: The Early Work of Man Ray" for the Montclair Art Museum.

For nineteen years—from 2001 to 2020—he operated a gallery in New York City on 57th Street, in the heart of the midtown gallery district. His gallery showed the work of artists Marcel Duchamp, Beatrice Wood and Man Ray among others.

He has published Marcel Duchamp: The Art of Chess, in which the correlation between Duchamp's chess activities and his art is examined and, most recently, a monograph on the photographer Naomi Savage, the niece of Man Ray, published by the Milton Art Bank in 2020. His writings on Marcel Duchamp were published as The Recurrent, Haunting Ghost: Essays on the Art, Life and Legacy of Marcel Duchamp (New York: Readymade Press, 2012). In 2019, his autobiographical account of his relationship with art historians Leo Steinberg and John Rewald (among others) and the artist Beatrice Wood was published as MENTORS: The Making of an Art Historian (Doppelhouse Press).

See also
Beatrice Wood: Mama of Dada

References

External links
Francis M. Naumann Fine Art

Dada
Place of birth missing (living people)
Parsons School of Design faculty
American art dealers
Living people
1948 births